Xylopolis was a town of Mygdonia in ancient Macedonia, whose inhabitants, the Xylopolitae, are mentioned by Pliny the Elder.

The site of Xylopolis is unlocated, but a location near Krestonis is suggested.

References

Populated places in ancient Macedonia
Former populated places in Greece
Lost ancient cities and towns
Geography of ancient Mygdonia